Narco is a 2004 French film about Gus (played by Guillaume Canet) a narcoleptic, whose life is made difficult by his inability to keep a job because of his narcolepsy.

Plot
The main character Gus experiences vivid dreams during his narcoleptic episodes, which inspire him to create comic book style art of extremely high quality. When Samuel Pupkin, the psychiatrist who runs a group attended by Gus, learns of this, he recalls his own desire to be a comic book artist, instead of following the family tradition of psychiatry, a dream prevented by his lack of artistic talent. Motivated by greed, jealousy, and desire for fame he hatches a plot, involving figure skating assassins, to steal Gus's work and pass it off as his own. The attempt on Gus's life fails but he ends up in a coma. Pupkin pays Gus's wife and best friend (who have begun an affair) for the art and sells it to a failed-comedian turned successful publisher, who in turn plans to erase the text and replace it with his own, and in this way have his genius for comedy finally recognized.

When Gus awakens from his coma, he reports to the police that someone is trying to kill him, but as he can think of no reason why, the police dismiss his claims. He then discovers that he is no longer narcoleptic, but finds it convenient to pretend he still is. In this way he discovers the affair of his wife and best friend, and through further investigation the theft of his work. The publisher angry that because of the Pupkin's deception, Gus could cause problems for them, demands that Pupkin solve it. Pupkin once more sends the assassins after Gus, but Gus's best friend, after wrestling with his conscience, talks them out of killing him. The police now believe his story and investigate the publisher who goes to jail, where he finally finds success as a comedian, performing for the other inmates. Pupkin goes insane and is confined to a hospital. Gus reconciles with his wife and finally gets a job.
     
In a minor role, Jean-Claude Van Damme appears as an imagined version of himself, when one character who idolises him as the ultimate 'Karate man', imagines a conversation where he acts as that character's conscience.

Cast
 Guillaume Canet - Gustave Klopp
 Zabou Breitman - Pamela
 Benoît Poelvoorde - Lenny Bar
 Guillaume Gallienne - Samuel Pupkin
 François Berléand - Guy Bennet
 Jean-Pierre Cassel - Gus's father
 Vincent Rottiers - Kevin
 Philippe Lellouche - Hervé
 Laurent Lafitte - The host
 Léa Drucker - The twin
 Gilles Lellouche - The twin
 Anne Marivin - The objects woman
 Lionel Abelanski - The supermarket director
 Philippe Lefebvre - The gym teacher
 François Levantal - The twin's father
 Jean-Noël Brouté - The doctor

Soundtrack

References

External links
 

2004 films
French comedy films
2000s French-language films
Films about comics
Films about fictional painters
2000s French films